Jiandui (common misspelling ) is a type of fried Chinese pastry and made from glutinous rice flour. The pastry is coated with sesame seeds on the outside and is crisp and chewy after immediately cooked. Inside the pastry is a large hollow, caused by the expansion of the dough. The hollow of the pastry is filled with a filling usually consisting of lotus paste, or alternatively sweet black bean paste, or red bean paste. They are also sometimes referred to as sesame balls.

Depending on the region and cultural area, jian dui is known as matuan in North and Northwestern China, ma yuan in northeast China, and zhen dai in Hainan.

Origin 
The origins of jian dui can be traced back to the Tang dynasty as a royal food in Chang'an, known as lüdui. This food item was also recalled in a poem by the Tang poet Wang Fanzhi. With the southward migration of many peoples from central China since An–Shi Rebellion, the jian dui was brought along and hence became part of southern Chinese cuisine.

Across Asia

East Asia

China 
In Hong Kong, it is one of the most standard pastries. It can also be found in most Chinatown bakery shops overseas.

Japan 
It is often sold at street fairs, in Chinese districts, and at various restaurants.

Korea 
In Korea, it is called jungguksik chamkkaegyeongdan ("Chinese-style sesame rice ball cake") to avoid confusion with Korean-style sesame rice ball cake (chamkkae-gyeongdan) with sesame coating. As the Chinese jian dui is first coated with sesame seeds then deep-fried, while the Korean gyeongdan is first boiled then coated with toasted sesame seeds, jian dui is also called twigin chamkkaegyeongdan("deep-fried sesame rice ball cake").

South Asia

India and Sri Lanka 
In Tamil Nadu and northeast Sri Lanka, it is known as ellu urundai or ellurundai (எள்ளுருண்டை), the local word meaning sesame ball. In Sinhalese, mainly used in Sri Lanka, it is called Thuri Guli (තල ගුලි), which translates as sesame ball. It is made in different sizes and colors. It is usually filled with sesame seeds, jaggery, sugar, or glucose syrup.

Southeast Asia

Cambodia 
Cambodian num kroch (នំ ក្រូច) is said to have originated in China where it is called jian dui or sometimes maqiu. The Chinese probably exported it as they migrated to other parts of Asia. They have a different name based on their origin, in Khmer it is num kroch (or nom kroch), which means cake (num) orange (kroch) because its shape is reminiscent of the fruit. The stuffing of num kroch is made of mung beans. The envelope of the num kroch is composed of glutinous rice flour, which gives it this slightly elastic texture. Like most Asian desserts, num kroch are not very sweet. Mung bean paste should not be too dry either.

Indonesia 
In Indonesian cuisine, it is called onde-onde or kue moci, filled with sweetened mung bean paste. People usually eat it as snack. This pastry is also popular and widely available in Indo (Eurasian), Indonesian and Vietnamese outlets in the Netherlands.

Malaysia 
It is known as kuih bom, which is usually filled with shredded sweetened coconut, or nuts. Occasionally, it may be filled with red bean paste.

Among the mainly Hakka-speaking ethnic Chinese in the state of Sabah, jian dui is more commonly known as you chi.

Philippines 
In the Philippines, jian dui is called butsi (Spanish: buchi). Due to hundreds of years of Chinese settlement in the Philippines, the integration of Chinese cuisine (particularly Cantonese and Fujian) to local dishes has made buchi quite popular. To an extent, it has already been considered an icon of Chinese Filipino culinary tradition, sometimes associated with auspiciousness. As it is well known among ethnic Chinese and other Filipinos alike, local restaurants which are sometimes not even Chinese and fastfood chains such as Chowking have added the delicacy to the menu. Aside from the usual lotus and red bean paste, non-Chinese and indigenous ingredients have also been used for variety such as ube-flavored butsi. Unlike jian dui, Filipino buchi and derivates (like mache, masi, moche, and palitaw) can also be boiled or steamed in addition to being deep fried.

Vietnam 
In Vietnamese cuisine, two very similar dishes are called bánh cam (from southern Vietnam) and bánh rán (from northern Vietnam), both of which have a somewhat drier filling that is made from sweetened mung bean paste. Bánh rán is scented with jasmine flower essence (called mali in Thai).photo

Bánh rán can be sweet or savory. The sweet one is filled with mung bean. The savory one is filled with chopped meat, cassava vermicelli, mushroom, and a variety of other typically Vietnamese ingredients. It is usually served with vegetable and dipping sauce.

Outside Asia

Mauritius 
In Mauritius, jian dui is called jien-yan-e by the local Chinese community of Mauritius, but it is more commonly known as gato zinzli (also written as gato zingli or gato zinli) in creole; it can literally be translated as "sesame cake". It is one of the Mauritian snacks which was influenced by the presence of Sino-Mauritians on the island. The gato zinzli originated from China and was introduced in Mauritius by the Chinese migrants from Guangzhou and Guangdong in the 18th or 19th century. It is deep fried until it is slightly chewy and crispy outside before being coated with sesame seeds; it is made of sweet potato, glutinous rice and sometimes with red bean paste. They are typically eaten as snacks; but they are especially eaten during Chinese New Year as a traditional snack by Sino-Mauritians. The gato zinzli are also shared to family members and acquaintances on Chinese New Year by Sino-Mauritians as part of their customary tradition in order to accentuate the sharing and friendship spirit.

United States 
In American Chinese restaurants and pastry shops, it is known as sesame seed ball.

Gallery

See also 
 Bánh rán
 Benne ball
 Chapssal doughnut
 Dango
 Danja
 Dim sum
 Gyeongdan
 List of sesame seed dishes

References 

Cantonese cuisine
Cantonese words and phrases
Chinese bakery products
Deep fried foods
Dim sum
Glutinous rice dishes
Hong Kong cuisine
Mauritian cuisine
Tang dynasty